Finders Keepers is a 1966 British musical film directed by Sidney Hayers, written by Michael Pertwee and starring Cliff Richard and The Shadows. It was released in the U.S. the following year. A search was made to find an actress to play the Spanish girl who falls for Cliff, and the 21-year-old Viviane Ventura won the role: born in London, but fluent in Spanish, she sang a spirited duet with Cliff on "Paella".

Plot
Cliff and The Shadows travel to a Spanish town for a gig. When they arrive they are puzzled to find the area empty. They find out that a small bomb has accidentally been dropped on the town and the villagers have fled in panic that it will go off. The boys decide to find the bomb and restore peace in the village, with some musical numbers along the way.

Influence 
The story is loosely based on a real accident on 17 January 1966, when a US B-52 strategic bomber, carrying four thermonuclear bombs, collided in mid-air with KC-135 tanker plane near Palomares, Spain. Three of the four hydrogen bombs were soon found on land near Palomares, and the fourth bomb was recovered from the Mediterranean Sea on 7 April.

Cast
Cliff Richard as Cliff
Hank Marvin as Himself (as The Shadows)
Bruce Welch as Himself (as The Shadows)
Brian Bennett as Himself (as The Shadows)
John Rostill as Himself (as The Shadows)
Robert Morley as Colonel Roberts
 Viviane Ventura as Emilia
Peggy Mount as Mrs. Bragg
Graham Stark as Burke
John Le Mesurier as Mr. X
Ellen Pollock as Grandma
Ernest Clark as Air Marshal
Burnell Tucker as Pilot
George Roderick as Priest
Bill Mitchell as G.I. Guard
Robert Hutton as Commander

Critical reception
The Radio Times described the film as a "dismal romp" which "marked the end of Cliff's screen collaboration with the Shadows". Variety wrote that "Michael Pertwee’s screenplay does not build up much urgency or suspense but provides opportunity for colorful fiesta, a gentle romance between Richard and Ventura, some verbal dueling between Robert Morley and Graham Stark". Sky Movies noted that "Peggy Mount and Robert Morley ('For £10,000, I'd walk naked down Horse Guards Parade') provide formidable comedy support for the stars."

Music
Music and lyrics by The Shadows. Songs include: "Finders Keepers," "Washerwoman," "My Way," "Paella," "La, La, La," "Fiesta," and "Time Drags By."

Soundtrack

The soundtrack album Finders Keepers by Cliff Richard and The Shadows was released on Columbia Records (Columbia SCX 6079). It was their fourth film soundtrack album and Richard's eighteenth album overall. The album reached number 6 in the UK Album Charts in an 18-week run in the top 40.

Track listing
"Finders Keepers" (Cliff Richard and The Shadows)
"Time Drags By" (Cliff Richard and The Shadows)
"Washerwoman" (Cliff Richard and The Shadows)
"La La La song" (Cliff Richard and The Shadows)
"My Way" (The Shadows)
"Oh Senorita" (Cliff Richard and The Shadows)
"Spanish Music" (The Shadows)
"Fiesta" (Cliff Richard and The Shadows)
"This Day" (Cliff Richard and The Shadows)
"Paella" (Cliff Richard and The Shadows)
"Finders Keepers"/"My Way"/"Paella"/"Fiesta" (Medley) (The Shadows)
"Run to the Door" (not from the film)
"Where Did the Summer Go" (not from the film)
"Into Each Life Some Rain Must Fall" (Cliff Richard and The Shadows) (not from the film)

Tagline
The film's tagline is 'The beat is the wildest! The blast is the craziest!... and the fun is where you find it!'

References

External links

1966 films
British musical comedy films
Films shot at Pinewood Studios
Films directed by Sidney Hayers
1960s English-language films
1960s British films